Blue Beach Military Cemetery at San Carlos is a British war cemetery in the Falkland Islands holding the remains of 14 of the 255 British casualties killed during the Falklands War in 1982, and one other killed in early 1984. It is situated close to where 3 Commando Brigade had its initial headquarters after landing on 21 May 1982.

Up until 1982 all British servicemen killed in action were buried and commemorated as close to the place of death as possible and the Commonwealth War Graves Commission managed these graves.

After the Falklands War, one family requested the repatriation of their fallen son's body and, following this, other families requested the same; as a result, this offer was extended to all relatives. On 16 November 1982 64 of the dead (52 soldiers, 11 Royal Marines, and one laundryman from Hong Kong) were returned to Britain aboard the landing ship Sir Bedivere.

The families of 16 of the dead kept with tradition and preferred their sons' remains should stay in the islands. Fourteen are buried at Port San Carlos with two more at isolated single grave sites at Goose Green and Port Howard. The fifteenth person interred at Port San Carlos is Captain John Belt of the Army Air Corps, who died in a helicopter crash in January 1984.

Design
In 1982, at the request of the Ministry of Defence, the Commonwealth War Graves Commission undertook the design and construction of a cemetery and memorial. The plans were approved by the MOD on 12 November 1982 at a total cost of £50,000. The work was completed with the assistance of 8 Field Squadron Royal Engineers and the Brigade of Gurkhas and dedicated on 10 April 1983. The headstones are of Orton Scar limestone and the memorial panels are of light sea green slate from Cumbria.

The cemetery is surrounded by a 3 feet (1 metre) high wall with a small entrance open to the beach in the style of a stone sheep corral. Opposite the entrance, the wall is tapered higher with seven slate panels, six with the Regiment, Name, Rank and Service of the fallen and one with the three Forces' Emblems and the following inscription;

1982

APRIL–JUNE

IN HONOUR OF

THE SOUTH ATLANTIC TASK FORCE

AND TO THE ABIDING MEMORY OF

THE SAILORS, SOLDIERS AND AIRMEN

WHO GAVE THEIR LIVES AND WHO

HAVE NO GRAVE BUT THE SEA

HERE BESIDE THE

GRAVES OF THEIR COMRADES THIS

MEMORIAL RECORDS THEIR NAMES

GIVE GLORY TO THE LORD AND

DECLARE HIS PRAISE IN THE ISLANDS

The site is divided into two sections each with seven graves. The section on the right is known as the Airborne Cemetery as it contains the remains of four Paratroopers including that of Lieutenant-Colonel "H" Jones. Directly opposite are another seven headstones laid out in the same pattern with the remains of seven Royal Marines. The grave of Captain Belt sits on its own inside the entry gate to the right, having been added after the cemetery was completed. Nearby is the San Carlos museum, with photographs and relics from the conflict.

On 21 May 2002, the 20th anniversary of the landings, a service of remembrance was held at the cemetery. Over 300 islanders and personnel from the garrison joined the Falklands Governor, in remembering those who lost their lives in the campaign. Ahead of this ceremony, the cemetery landscaping around the graves was overhauled and refreshed through the installation of timber boards, gravel infill, and planting.  This work was organised through and carried out by contracting organisations employed at the Mount Pleasant military base.

National Memorial Arboretum in Staffordshire
On 20 May 2012, a duplicate of the San Carlos Memorial was dedicated at the National Memorial Arboretum in Staffordshire England. The official dedication, which was attended by The Band of Her Majesty's Royal Marines also marked the 30th anniversary of the landings.

Speaking at the ceremony, the widow of Lieutenant-Colonel H Jones, Sara, described the memorial as a "Fitting tribute to the members of the Task Force who gave their lives".

Breakdown of the casualties
A total of 255 British servicemen and 3 female Falkland Island civilians were killed during the Falklands War.
 Royal Navy – 86 + 2 Hong Kong laundrymen
 Royal Marines – 27 (2 officers, 14 NCOs and 11 marines)
 Royal Fleet Auxiliary – 4 + 4 Hong Kong laundrymen
 Merchant navy – 6 + 2 Hong Kong sailors
 British Army – 123 (7 officers, 40 NCOs and 76 privates)
 Royal Air Force – 1 (1 officer)
 Falkland Islands civilians – 3 women killed by British shelling.

174 were buried at sea, or lost with their aircraft/ships and their remains not recovered.  These are controlled sites under the Protection of Military Remains Act.
  – 1
  –20
 Sea King –1+22
  – 22
 Sea Harrier – 3
  –2
  – 18
  – 12
 LC Foxtrot 4 of  – 6
 Bluff Cove –54
  –13

Buried in other places

 Lt Nick Taylor RN, shot down over Goose Green by radar-controlled, 35mm Oerlikon fire from GADA 601 as he ran in to attack.  Argentine forces buried Taylor with military honours close to where his plane crashed.
 Captain Gavin Hamilton is buried at Port Howard on West Falkland, where he was killed when his observation post was uncovered by Argentine commandos at Many Branch point.
 Two of three Falkland Civilians killed during the war, Doreen Bonner and Mary Goodwin, were buried in Port Stanley after the war.  Susan Whitely was interred on Sea Lion Island, the most southerly inhabited island in the Falklands.

Three more deaths may be attributed to Operation Corporate, bringing the total to 261:
 Captain Brian Biddick from SS Uganda underwent an emergency operation on the voyage to the Falklands, was repatriated by an RAF medical flight to the hospital at Wroughton, where he died on 12 May.
 Able Seaman David McCann died of wounds 19 August, as a result of the Exocet hit on HMS Glamorgan.
 Marine Engineering Mechanic Paul Mills, from HMS Coventry, suffered complications from a skull fracture sustained in the sinking of his ship and died on 29 March 1983. He is buried in his home town of Swavesey.

See also
 Argentine Military Cemetery – near Darwin Settlement, it holds the remains of 237 Argentine casualties
 Grytviken Cemetery – which holds the remains of Félix Artuso, an Argentinian submarine officer who was killed in the 1982 British recapture of South Georgia from Argentina

References

External links
 
 San Carlos remembrance page
 Pictorials
 

British military memorials and cemeteries
Aftermath of the Falklands War
Cemeteries in the Falkland Islands
Commonwealth War Graves Commission cemeteries in the United Kingdom
1982 establishments in the Falkland Islands